Edward Lutterlock (26 February 1852 – 30 July 1938) was an English cricketer. Lutterlock was a right-handed batsman who bowled right-arm roundarm fast. He was born at Stockwell, Surrey.

Lutterlock made three first-class appearances for Surrey in 1874, against Yorkshire at Bramall Lane, Sheffield, Nottinghamshire at Trent Bridge, with his third appearance being a return fixture against Nottinghamshire at The Oval. In his three first-class matches, he scored 23 runs in his two matches, at an average of 3.83, with a high score of 8.

He died at St Albans, Hertfordshire, on 30 July 1938.

References

External links
Edward Lutterlock at ESPNcricinfo
Edward Lutterlock at CricketArchive

1852 births
1938 deaths
People from Stockwell
English cricketers
Surrey cricketers